Joseph Patrick Kennedy III (born October 4, 1980) is an American lawyer, politician and diplomat who currently serves as United States Special Envoy for Northern Ireland since 2022. A member of the Democratic Party, he represented a district that extends from Boston's western suburbs to the state's South Coast. He worked as an assistant district attorney in the Cape and Islands and Middlesex County, Massachusetts, offices before his election to Congress. In January 2021, he became a CNN commentator.

A member of the Kennedy family, he is a son of U.S. Representative Joseph P. Kennedy II, a grandson of U.S. Senator and U.S. Attorney General Robert F. Kennedy, a grandnephew of U.S. President John F. Kennedy and U.S. Senator Edward M Kennedy, and a great-grandson of U.S. Ambassador to Great Britain Joseph P. Kennedy Sr.

Born in Boston, Kennedy was raised in the area with his twin brother, Matthew Rauch Kennedy. After graduating from Stanford University with a bachelor's degree, he spent two years in the Dominican Republic as a member of the Peace Corps, before earning a Juris Doctor at Harvard Law School in 2009. He resigned from his role as assistant district attorney in early 2012 to run for the U.S. House of Representatives seat held by the retiring Barney Frank. Kennedy was sworn into office in January 2013, and sat on the House Committee on Energy and Commerce.

In 2020, rather than run for re-election to his House seat, Kennedy unsuccessfully challenged incumbent Senator Ed Markey for the Democratic nomination in the Massachusetts U.S. Senate election. He was succeeded by fellow Democrat Jake Auchincloss. Since leaving office, he has founded Project Groundwork, which focuses on boosting local community organizing efforts throughout the United States. He has also joined several advisory boards and began appearing as a political commentator for CNN. On June 4, 2021, President Joe Biden appointed him to be a member of the President's Commission on White House Fellowships.

In December 2022, Kennedy was named the United States Special Envoy to Northern Ireland for Economic Affairs by President Biden.

Early life and career
Kennedy was born on October 4, 1980, in Brigham and Women's Hospital in Boston, to Sheila Brewster (Rauch) (b. 1949) and Joseph P. Kennedy II. He was born eight minutes after his fraternal twin brother, Matthew. The twins are the eldest grandsons of Senator Robert F. Kennedy and Ethel Kennedy. Kennedy is also the great-great-grandson of Benjamin Brewster, one of the original trustees of Standard Oil. They were raised in Brighton and the coastal town of Marshfield, Massachusetts, also spending summers on Cape Cod. From birth, Kennedy was surrounded by politics; in 1980, his parents worked on the presidential campaign of U.S. Senator Ted Kennedy, the boys' grand-uncle. Kennedy's father was elected to Congress in 1986. His parents divorced in 1991. The twins spent the following years moving between Brighton and Cambridge.

After graduating from Buckingham Browne & Nichols School in Cambridge, Kennedy and his brother enrolled at Stanford University, where he majored in management science and engineering. Kennedy's reputation as a teetotaler earned him the college nickname "Milkman", as his teammates on the club lacrosse team would jokingly order him glasses of milk at bars. At Stanford, Kennedy roomed with future NBA player Jason Collins and was a member of the Kappa Alpha Order fraternity.

After graduating in 2003, Kennedy joined the Peace Corps; a fluent Spanish speaker, he worked in the Dominican Republic's Puerto Plata province from 2004 to 2006, helping local tour guides in the 27 Charcos reserve in the Río Damajagua Park. He reorganized the group with some outside backing, directing the guides to rebuild parts of the park and develop skills to make the operation more attractive to tourists. "We basically created a union," said Kennedy, who reported that the group's efforts won higher wages for employees while increasing the tour companies' revenue. According to a press release, his other activities in the Peace Corps included "stints as an Anti-Poverty Consultant for the Office of the President of the Democratic Republic of Timor-Leste and a Research Analyst for the United Nations Development Program."

Entry into law and politics

In April 2006, Kennedy returned to Massachusetts, where he and his brother co-chaired Ted Kennedy's re-election campaign. The same month, Kennedy enrolled in Harvard Law School. There, he worked for the Harvard Legal Aid Bureau, providing legal aid to low-income tenants with foreclosure cases in the wake of the 2008 financial crisis, and as a technical editor for the Harvard Human Rights Journal, on a staff with his classmate and future wife, Lauren Anne Birchfield. In 2007, he and Birchfield co-founded Picture This: Justice and Power, an after-school program for youths in Boston's Jamaica Plain neighborhood. He began an internship at the Cape and Islands District Attorney's Office in 2008.

After earning his Juris Doctor in 2009, Kennedy was hired at the Cape and Islands Office as an assistant district attorney (DA). He considered running for the Cape-based U.S. House seat held by retiring Rep. Bill Delahunt in early 2010, but decided against it. In September 2011, he joined the Middlesex County, Massachusetts, District Attorney's Office, also as an assistant DA. He resigned several months later, in preparation for the announcement that he would seek political office.

U.S. House of Representatives

Elections

2012 

In January 2012, Kennedy announced he would form an exploratory committee to run in the newly redrawn 4th congressional district of Massachusetts. Kennedy explained, "I will then begin to reach out to the people of the Fourth District, in order to hear directly from them about the challenges they are facing and their ideas on how we can restore fairness to our system. I will make a final decision about entering the race in the weeks thereafter."

He officially entered the election in February 2012. In an announcement video, Kennedy declared, "I believe this country was founded on a simple idea: that every person deserves to be treated fairly, by each other and by their government". In the same video, Kennedy vowed to fight for a "fair job plan", a "better educational system", a "fair tax code", and a "fair housing policy".

While several Democratic candidates had prepared to enter the race, the field nearly cleared once Kennedy announced his candidacy. His family roots made him the overwhelming favorite among Massachusetts Democrats. In the September 6 primary, he faced Rachel Brown, a Lyndon LaRouche acolyte, and Herb Robinson, an engineer and musician, winning the primary with around 90 percent of the vote. He was elected to the House of Representatives on November 6, 2012, defeating Republican candidate Sean Bielat, winning over 60% of the vote.

2014 

In the 2014 election, Kennedy ran unopposed in the primary and general elections. On November 4, 2014, he was re-elected to a second term with 184,158 votes (98%).

2016 

In 2016, after running unopposed in the Democratic primary, Kennedy was re-elected to a third term, defeating Republican David Rosa by more than 40 percentage points.

2018 

Kennedy was mentioned as a potential candidate for the 2018 Massachusetts gubernatorial election but declined, running for re-election to the House and saying he had no plans to run for any other office. He was re-elected unopposed.

Tenure 

Kennedy was sworn into the 113th U.S. Congress on January 3, 2013, and assigned to the Committee on Foreign Affairs and the Committee on Science, Space, and Technology. He praised the technology committee assignment as an opportunity to secure federal funding, including National Science Foundation and Small Business Innovation Research grants, for life sciences companies in his district. As a freshman in his party, he was unable to secure a seat he had sought on the Education Committee.

During a February science committee hearing, Kennedy questioned Texas Instruments president Richard Templeton about the company's efforts to compensate cancer-stricken former employees of its Attleboro, Massachusetts, nuclear facility. A prolific fundraiser, he launched his political action committee, the 4MA PAC, in April. As a member of the Foreign Affairs Committee, he traveled in May with four other legislators to Afghanistan, where they met with President Hamid Karzai and members of the military. That month, he was named chairman of Governor Deval Patrick's STEM Advisory Council.

On July 24, 2013, Kennedy was one of seven members of the Congressional Progressive Caucus (CPC) to vote against the Amash-Conyers amendment to limit Section 215 of the Patriot Act, which tried to restrict NSA surveillance programs. In contrast, a majority of both CPC members and of Democratic members of Congress voted for the amendment, while Kennedy stood out as a supporter of the party leadership. His vote has been criticized as a sign for a lack of commitment to civil liberties.

Kennedy was a member of the U.S.-Japan Caucus.

Response to the 2018 State of the Union 

On January 26, 2018, House Minority Leader Nancy Pelosi and Senate Minority Leader Chuck Schumer announced that Kennedy would deliver the Democratic response to President Donald Trump's 2018 State of the Union address. His selection came after criticism that the Democratic Party had relied too heavily on its oldest leaders since the 2016 presidential election. In choosing Kennedy, the party was seen as trying to bridge the gap with a new face attached to one of the most famous names in American politics. On January 30, he gave the response to television cameras and a live studio audience in the automotive body shop of Diman Regional Vocational Technical High School at Fall River, Massachusetts. The location was meant to emphasize the role immigrants have in American society. He spent the opening minutes of his speech boasting about the economy and industrial history of Fall River, a city in his district. His audience included Diman Regional Technical School students. He praised Black Lives Matter, and spoke in Spanish about children who were brought into the United States illegally when they were minors. He also took numerous swings at Trump, criticizing the Department of Justice for "rolling back civil rights by the day" and attacking the administration for "targeting the very idea that we are all worthy of protection". He accused Trump of turning American life "into a zero-sum game", and said that Democrats intended to aid the middle and lower classes. He closed by characterizing the state of the union as "hopeful, resilient, enduring".

2020 Senate campaign 

On August 26, 2019, Kennedy announced he was considering a primary challenge against incumbent Senator Ed Markey, and on September 21, he formally announced his candidacy. He announced that he would not seek re-election, instead challenging Markey in the Democratic primary for the 2020 United States Senate election in Massachusetts. On September 1, 2020, Markey defeated him in the Democratic primary. Kennedy became the first member of his family to lose an election in Massachusetts.

His defeat was widely attributed to his inability to explain his reasons for running. Additionally, Markey had strength among progressives and younger voters, buoyed by active youth involvement. Kennedy was endorsed by House Speaker Nancy Pelosi, while Markey had the support of Senate Minority Leader Chuck Schumer, former Vice-President Al Gore, Senator Elizabeth Warren, Representative Alexandria Ocasio-Cortez, the youth-led Sunrise Movement, and The Boston Globe. The race was considered a showdown between the Democratic establishment and its new and growing progressive wing, though the lines between the two were blurred, as Kennedy was a member of the Congressional Progressive Caucus, endorsed by many members, and Markey had been in Congress 43 years at the time.

Biden Administration

United States Special Envoy to Northern Ireland for Economic Affairs
On December 19, 2022, President Biden announced Kennedy would replace Mick Mulvaney as U.S. Special Envoy for Northern Ireland. Mulvaney retired in 2021.

He is the fifth Kennedy family member to serve as a diplomat. Cousin Caroline Kennedy was U.S. Ambassador to Japan from 2013 to 2017 and has been U.S. Ambassador to Australia since June 2022. Aunt Victoria Reggie Kennedy has been U.S. Ambassador to Austria since January 2022. Aunt Jean Kennedy Smith was U.S. Ambassador to Ireland from 1993 to 1998. Uncle Sargent Shriver was U.S. Ambassador to France from 1968 to 1970. Great-grandfather Joseph P. Kennedy Sr. was U.S. Ambassador to the United Kingdom from 1938 to 1940.

Political positions

Civil rights
Kennedy has co-sponsored legislation to study reparations for slavery, supports measures to expand the civil rights of Native Americans, opposes discrimination in employment, housing, education, and health care, and supports removing barriers to equal opportunities for people with disabilities, including improving access to public transit, housing, voting, and education. He supports LGBTQIA+ rights, recognition of a national Transgender Day of Remembrance, and is a member of the Congressional Transgender Equality Task Force. In the area of gender equity, he is an advocate of legislation to end workplace discrimination and wage discrimination, and is a supporter of the Me Too movement.

Marijuana legalization
Kennedy helped raise funds in 2016 for the defeat of Question 4 to legalize cannabis for recreational use in Massachusetts. He also voted against the Rohrabacher–Farr amendment in 2015 which limits the enforcement of federal law in states that have legalized medical cannabis. In November 2018 he changed his stance towards cannabis and endorsed its legalization at the federal level, however. In January 2020 he co-sponsored a bill to federally legalize cannabis known as the Marijuana Opportunity Reinvestment and Expungement (MORE) Act.

Climate change
Kennedy co-sponsored the Green New Deal, and supports aggressive action to reduce carbon emissions, enforce pollution control standards, protect public lands from fossil fuel extraction, promote clean energy alternatives to pipelines and compressor stations, and invest in related infrastructure and scientific research. He supports strict fuel efficiency standards and the elimination of exemptions to the Clean Air Act, and opposed the United States' withdrawal from the Paris Agreement under President Donald Trump.

Racial inequality
Kennedy has helped pass legislation to guarantee access to STEM and vocational education, and co-sponsored legislation to eliminate most student debt. He has also co-sponsored legislation to reduce racial discrimination in housing, favors increasing the portion of federal grants earmarked for minority-owned small businesses, and supports criminal justice reform.

Health care
Kennedy supports strengthening Social Security and Medicare, and favors having Medicare negotiate prescription drug prices directly with drug manufacturers.

Electoral history

Personal life

Kennedy married health policy lawyer Lauren Anne Birchfield in Corona del Mar, California, on December 1, 2012. The couple met in a Harvard Law School class taught by future U.S. Senator Elizabeth Warren. On December 29, 2015, Birchfield gave birth to their daughter, Eleanor. On December 20, 2017, Kennedy announced the birth of their second child, a son, named James. The family lives in Newton, Massachusetts.

Kennedy's net worth is about $43 million, which made him among the wealthiest members of Congress.

See also
 Kennedy family

References

External links

 
 Complete video of debate, February 18, 2020 – C-SPAN
 Complete video of Markey-Kennedy debate, August 11, 2020 – C-SPAN
 

|-

|-

1980 births
21st-century American lawyers
21st-century American politicians
American people of Dutch descent
American people of Irish descent
American prosecutors
Buckingham Browne & Nichols School alumni
Candidates in the 2020 United States Senate elections
County district attorneys in Massachusetts
Democratic Party members of the United States House of Representatives from Massachusetts
Harvard Law School alumni
Joe
Lawyers from Boston
Living people
Massachusetts lawyers
Peace Corps volunteers
Politicians from Boston
Stanford University alumni
American twins
CNN people
United States Special Envoys